Alberto Artuso (born 10 May 1989) is an Italian footballer currently playing for Chievo.

External links
 

1989 births
Living people
Italian footballers
Association football defenders
F.C. Südtirol players